Scott Roller is an artist whose work has appeared in role-playing games.

Career
His Dungeons & Dragons work includes interior art for Monster Manual II (2002), Savage Species (2003), Arms and Equipment Guide (2003), Ghostwalk (2003), the revised 3.5 Dungeon Master's Guide (2003), Complete Divine (2004), Races of Stone (2004), Red Hand of Doom (2006), and Tome of Magic (2006).

References

External links
 

Living people
Place of birth missing (living people)
Role-playing game artists
Year of birth missing (living people)